Léro is a surname. Notable people with the surname include:

Étienne Léro (1910–1939), French poet
Jane Léro (1916–1961), Martiniquais feminist and communist activist
Thélus Léro (1909–1996), Martiniquais politician
Yva Léro (1912–2007), Martiniquais painter and writer

See also 
Leroy (name)